Gulshara Naushaqyzy Abdykhalikova (Gülşara Nauşaqyzy Äbdıqalyqova; born 15 May 1965) is a Kazakh politician who is currently an akim of Kyzylorda Region since 28 March 2020. Prior to that, she served as the member of the Mazhilis from 16 August 2019 to 27 March 2020, Deputy Prime Minister of Kazakhstan twice from 25 February 2019 to 20 August 2019 and from 28 November 2013 to 11 November 2014. She was also the State Secretary of Kazakhstan from 11 November 2014 to 25 February 2019 and a Minister of Labour and Social Protection of the Population from 4 March 2009 to 24 September 2012.

Biography

Early life and education 
Abdykhalikova was born in the village of  Solo Tyube. In 1987, she graduated from the Jambyl Technological Institute of the Light and Food Industry, majoring in economics.

In 2005, Abdykhalikova earned her candidacy of economic sciences on her dissertation topic "Capitalization of pension funds: problems and prospects (examples of NPFs of the Republic of Kazakhstan)".

Career 
From 1987, she worked as a senior inspector, head of the Kyzylorda Regional Department of Social Protection of the Population. In 1994, Abdykhalikova became a consultant to the Committee of the Supreme Soviet of Kazakhstan.

After its dissolution in 1995, she worked at the Ministry of Labour and Social Protection of the Population as the head of department, deputy head of department, head of Pension Management, deputy director of the Department of Social Security, director of the Department of Social Security and Social Assistance, director of the Department of Pension Provision and Income Regulation Population.

In March 2003, Abdykhalikova became a Vice Minister of Labour and Social Protection of the Population. She served that position until being appointed as the Chair of the Board of JSC Life Insurance Company in December 2005. She was reappointed again as the Vice Minister in October 2006. From October 2007 to January 2008, Abdykhalikova served as the Executive Secretary of the Ministry. In January 2008, she was appointed as an adviser to the President of Kazakhstan and the chair of the National Commission for Women and Family and Demographic Policy under the President.

On 4 March 2009, Abdykhalikova became the Minister of Labour and Social Protection of the Population until becoming the advisor to the President again in September 2012. 

On 28 November 2013, Abdykhalikova was appointed as the Deputy Prime Minister of Kazakhstan. She served that position until becoming the State Secretary of Kazakhstan on 11 November 2014. From 25 February to 20 August 2019, Abdykhalikova again served as the Deputy Prime Minister before being relieved from her post and becoming a member of the Mazhilis. From there, she was elected as the chair of the Chamber Committee on Socio-Cultural Development on 4 September 2019.

From March 28, 2020 to April 7, 2022, Abdykalikova was the akim of Kyzylorda Region, which made her the first woman in Kazakhstan to hold such a position.

Since June 6, Gulshara Abdykalikova has been a business partner in human resource management of JSC NC KazMunayGas.

External links 
Информация о руководстве Министерства труда и социальной защиты населения РК

References

1965 births
Living people
Nur Otan politicians
Government ministers of Kazakhstan
People from Kyzylorda Region
21st-century Kazakhstani women politicians
21st-century Kazakhstani politicians
Deputy Prime Ministers of Kazakhstan